Adolph Stephan Friedrich Jentsch (29 December 1888 Dresden – 18 April 1977 Windhoek) was a German-born Namibian artist. He studied at the Dresden Staatsakademie für Bildende Künste (Dresden Art Academy, today's College of Fine Arts) for six years, and used a travel grant award to visit France, Italy, UK and the Netherlands. Jentsch moved to Namibia in 1938 to escape the approaching war and lived there until his death. He travelled extensively in Namibia and eventually settled down near Dordabis, about 60 km from the capital Windhoek.  He is one of Namibia's most famous painters.

Life and career

Germany
Jentsch was the son of a Lutheran church official, Stephan Jentsch, and his wife Adele.  He attended the gymnasium of the Brudergemeine Zinzendorf, at Nieski. Six years of further education followed at Dresden's Staatsakademie fϋr Bildende Künste. Other student artists at the Academy were Max Pechstein, George Grosz and Kurt Schwitters. He was awarded the Königlich-Sächsische Staatsmedaille fur Kunst und Wissenschaft and several travel grants. Later, Jentsch often worked for Otto Gussmann, decorating public buildings.

Jentsch was in the Jäger-Reserve in the First World War, but developed a crippling rheumatism that put him into a military hospital at Neustadt for a year. After the war, he married a young divorcee, Anne Ilgen, in 1920, and together they operated a small factory making spray-containers for perfume. Anne ran the factory while Jentsch painted. A son, Christoph, was born in 1921.

Jentsch illustrated a children's book in 1927, and joined a group of interior decorators in Czechoslovakia. He worked on colour schemes and decorative painting on jobs in Germany and Czechoslovakia.

Namibia
Jentsch's antipathy to National Socialism resulted in a loss of commissions, so he took up an offer to vacation on a friend's farm in Namibia (then called South West Africa). He arrived in Africa in early 1938, and never left, working in oils and watercolour until his death in 1977.

Jentsch painted landscapes almost exclusively, working in watercolour and oil. He was interested in Oriental philosophy, specifically Taoism, and was influenced by Chinese Art. He travelled extensively in Namibia, staying at many farms and painting the diverse landscapes, but in 1947 he finally settled on a farm near Dordabis called Brack, about 60 km from Windhoek, with his friends Gebhard and Dorothee von Funcke.

Jentsch found the Namibian landscape amenable to his mystic approach to art. His watercolours display the same calligraphic strokes seen in Chinese art. In 1960 Jentsch abandoned oils and worked only in watercolour.

Later life
In the early 1970s he suffered a stroke that left him with a severe tremor and stopped him painting completely. Jentsch and Dorothea von Funcke (whose husband had by now died) moved into a modest house in Windhoek for the last few years of his life.

Five of his paintings were reproduced as stamps in 1973 – the first non-commemorative stamps in South Africa philatelic history.

In 1975, farm workers at Brack, attempting to smoke out a wasp's nest, started a fire next to the old barn where Jentsch stored much of his oeuvre. The barn caught fire and burned down, with the result that the product of 40 years, including some of his most important works, was tragically lost.

Four of Jentsch's watercolours were reproduced in limited editions by Orde Levinson in 1975.

Awards
1913 Königlich-Sächsische Staatsmedaille für Kunst und Wissenschaft.
1958 Order of Merit, First Class, Federal Republic of West Germany.
1962 Medal of Honour for Painting, SA Akademie vir Wetenskap en Kuns.

Public Collections
Administration of South West Africa
Hester Rupert Art Museum, Graaf-Reinet
Johannesburg Art Gallery
King George VI Gallery, Port Elizabeth
Pietersburg Collection
Pretoria Art Museum
Pretoria University
Rand Afrikaans University, Johannesburg
Rembrandt van Rijn Art Foundation
S.A Association of Arts, Windhoek
S.A National Gallery, Cape Town
South African National Art Gallery, Cape Town
State Museum, Windhoek
UNISA
University of Stellenbosch
William Humphreys Gallery, Kimberley.

Art Exhibitions
 1938 : Adolph Jentsch's first one-man exhibition in Southern Africa, Windhoek.
 1954 : Venice Biennale
 1956 : First Quad of South African Art
 1958 : Retrospective Exhibition, Windhoek (70th Birthday); South African Exhibition touring Holland, Germany and Belgium.
 1960 Second Quad of South African Art.
 1962 : “South West African Artists’, South African National Art Gallery, Cape Town.
 1964 : Third Quad of South African Art.
 1966 : Republic Fest Exhibition, Pretoria.
 1967 : Prestige Exhibition, Johannesburg Art Gallery
 1968 : Retrospective Exhibition, SAAA, Windhoek (80th Birthday)
 1970/1 : Prestige Exhibition, Pretoria Art Museum
 1974 : Retrospective Exhibition, SAAA, Windhoek

Publications
Adolph Jentsch. Die Bilder aus der Zigarrenkiste. 2003, by Peter Strack
Gallery Magazine, Autumn 1984, Adolph Jentsch — Prayers in Paint by Mark A. Meaker
Adolph Jentsch. 1973, by Olga Levinson
Lantern, Vol.3, No.4, April–June, 1954: 'Adolph Jentsch' by Otto Schroder
Lantern, Vol.7, No.1, October, 1957: 'Vyf Kunstenaars uit Suidwes-Afrika'
Adolph Jentsch, SWA.: An appreciation with reproductions of watercolours painted by Jentsch in the surroundings of Brack. Essays by Otto Schroder and P. Anton Hendriks, Swakopmund, 1958 (70th anniversary)
Our Art, Vol.1: Essay by Otto Schroder, 1959
Fontein, Vol.1, No.1, 1960: 'Adolph Jentsch' by Anton Hendriks
Art in South Africa by F. L. Alexander, Cape Town, 1962
South West Africa Annual, 1970: 'Jentsch' by Olga Levinson
Art and artists of South Africa by Esme' Berman, Cape Town, 1970

Film
Jentsch, documentary sound film, 16mm, commissioned by The Friends of the South African National Gallery, Cape Town, 1970. Written and produced by Olga Levinson; filmed by Lewis-Lewis Productions.

References

20th-century German painters
20th-century German male artists
German male painters
Officers Crosses of the Order of Merit of the Federal Republic of Germany
Landscape artists
German emigrants to Namibia
White Namibian people
Namibian painters
1888 births
1977 deaths